Abel Santamaría Airport  is an international airport serving Santa Clara, the capital city of the Villa Clara Province in Cuba. It was named after the Cuban revolutionary Abel Santamaría. The airport is the main entry point for tourists travelling to Cayo Santa María and the other keys on the northern coast of the province.

On 31 August 2016, JetBlue Flight 387 from Fort Lauderdale, Florida landed at the airport to commence regular commercial flights between Fort Lauderdale and Santa Clara, the first commercial flight from the United States to Cuba in 54 years following the thaw in Cuba–United States relations.

Airlines and destinations
In April 2020, Cuba stopped all scheduled flights. From 1 July 2020, Cuba permitted restricted tourism to some cays, including Cayo Santa Maria. No flights to Santa Clara Airport have yet been reported. In October 2020, it was announced that the airport was reopening for regular commercial flights.

Santa Clara Air Base
The airport is an inactive Cuban Revolutionary Armed Forces air base:
 14th Tactical Regiment – Mikoyan-Gurevich MiG-23 BN bombers and older Mikoyan-Gurevich MiG-23UB fighters
 Tactical Air Command – Mikoyan-Gurevich MiG-23 BN bombers and older Mikoyan-Gurevich MiG-23UB fighters
 2661st Bomber Squadron
 1890th Interceptor Regiment – Mikoyan-Gurevich MiG-21B and UM fighters

Active Cuban Revolutionary Armed Forces helicopter squadron air base, flying:
– Mil Mi-17 (two seen flying around the airport in February 2013, and six on the ground including one being refueled) in the transport role and the Mi-24/35 in the troop support role.

References

External links

 
 
 Live Flight Tracking
 Departures
 Arrivals 

Airports in Cuba
Buildings and structures in Santa Clara, Cuba